Malta competed at the 2022 Commonwealth Games in Birmingham, England between 28 July and 8 August 2022. It was Malta's fourteenth appearance at the Games.

On 12 July 2022, the Maltese Olympic Committee announced a team of 29 athletes (13 men and 16 women) competing in nine sports. Squash athlete Kijan Sultana and weightlifter Tenishia Thornton were the country's opening ceremony flagbearers.

Medalists

Competitors
The following is the list of number of competitors participating at the Games per sport/discipline.

Athletics

A squad of four athletes was announced on 12 July 2022.

Women
Track and road events

Field events

Badminton

A squad of two players was announced on 12 July 2022.

Cycling

One cyclist (Aiden Buttigieg) was officially selected as of 12 July 2022.

Road
Men

Judo

A squad of two judoka was announced on 12 July 2022.

Lawn bowls

A squad of eight bowlers was selected on 28 April 2022.

Men

Women

Squash

A squad of four players was announced on 12 July 2022.

Singles

Doubles

Triathlon

A squad of two triathletes was announced on 12 July 2022.

Individual

Weightlifting

Courtesy of their positions on the IWF Commonwealth Ranking List (which was finalised on 9 March 2022), a squad of four weightlifters was officially selected on 23 April 2022.

Women

Wrestling

A squad of two wrestlers was announced on 12 July 2022.

See also
Malta at the 2022 Winter Olympics

References

External links
Maltese Olympic Committee Official site

Nations at the 2022 Commonwealth Games
Malta at the Commonwealth Games
2022 in Maltese sport